Stenochlaena hainanensis is a species of fern in the family Blechnaceae. It is endemic to China. Its natural habitat is subtropical or tropical dry forests. It is threatened by habitat loss.

References

Blechnaceae
Endemic flora of China
Endangered plants
Taxonomy articles created by Polbot
Plants described in 1964